John Jackson Hegarty (13 April 1925 – ) was a Scottish rugby union footballer of the 1950s. He played representative level rugby union for Scotland national, and at club level for Hawick RFC, as a lock.

Playing career

Genealogical information
He was the father of Brian Hegarty, who was also capped for Scotland.

References

Bath, Richard (ed.) The Scotland Rugby Miscellany (Vision Sports Publishing Ltd, 2007 )

External links
Statistics at en.espn.co.uk

1925 births
2016 deaths
Hawick RFC players
Rugby union locks
Rugby union players from Hawick
Scotland international rugby union players
Scottish rugby union players